Lysitsa is a rural locality (a village) in Yemetskoye Rural Settlement of Kholmogorsky District, Arkhangelsk Oblast, Russia. The population was 25 as of 2010.

Geography 
It is located on the Severnaya Dvina River, 117 km south of Kholmogory (the district's administrative centre) by road. Volost is the nearest rural locality.

References 

Rural localities in Kholmogorsky District